Iran sent a team to compete at the 2008 Summer Olympics in Beijing, China. In total 55 Iranian athletes went to Beijing, including three women. These Olympics are regarded as less successful than their previous Games, as Iran only achieved one gold and one bronze medal.

Medalists

| width="78%" align="left" valign="top" |

| width="22%" align="left" valign="top" |

Competitors

Archery

Athletics

Men
Track & road events

Field events

Combined events – Decathlon

Badminton

Basketball

Men's tournament
Roster

Group play

Boxing

Cycling

Road

Judo

Men

Rowing

Men

Women

Qualification Legend: FA=Final A (medal); FB=Final B (non-medal); FC=Final C (non-medal); FD=Final D (non-medal); FE=Final E (non-medal); FF=Final F (non-medal); SA/B=Semifinals A/B; SC/D=Semifinals C/D; SE/F=Semifinals E/F; QF=Quarterfinals; R=Repechage

Swimming

Men

Table tennis

Taekwondo

Weightlifting

Wrestling

Men's freestyle

Men's Greco-Roman

References

External links 
 National Olympic committee of Iran
 beijing2008.cn

Nations at the 2008 Summer Olympics
2008
Summer Olympics